Jacobus Barnard (born 24 February 1967) is a South African cricketer. He played in four first-class matches for Boland in 1989/90 and 1990/91.

See also
 List of Boland representative cricketers

References

External links
 

1967 births
Living people
South African cricketers
Boland cricketers
Cricketers from Paarl